Born September 3, 1978 and raised in Moscow, Svetlana "Lana" Parshina moved to the United States at 21. With multiple academic degrees, Lana Parshina initially worked as a Russian/English/German interpreter who had worked on projects with Library of Congress, a freelance journalist, and a public relations consultant/crisis manager in New York City. But, filmmaking was her passion and she left a vibrant career in crisis management to embrace her dream. In several years, she had produced a number of independent films. Svetlana about Svetlana, a documentary on Joseph Stalin's daughter – Svetlana Alliluyeva – was her directorial debut. Svetlana about Svetlana is used by many Ivy League Universities, such as Princeton, Yale, Stanford, as an audio-visual supplement to teaching 20th Century history classes. It is distributed in the US/Canada by Icarus Films.
In 2010, Parshina directed "360 Around the World" documentary about a Swiss pilot Riccardo Mortara breaking the world record in circumnavigating the globe aboard a 30-year-old Sabreliner 65.
In 2016, she directed "Singer who Fell" about a 105-year-old student of Konstantin Stanislavski, who still taught vocals in her Moscow apartment.

References

 Producer/Director's Bio – Cannes Film Festival/March du Films Market – 2007
 IMDb: https://www.imdb.com/name/nm2474627/
 Itogi magazine N. 11 (613) – http://www.itogi.ru/Paper2008.nsf/Article/Itogi_2008_03_09_00_3628.html
 KinoGeorgia – https://web.archive.org/web/20080420135440/http://www.kinogeorgia.com/women.html

Russian emigrants to the United States
Tisch School of the Arts alumni
American documentary film producers
Living people
Year of birth missing (living people)